Dennis Ward is an American bass player and music producer. He is known for his various works as a producer for heavy metal and hard rock bands in Europe, as well as for being the bassist and founder of the bands Pink Cream 69 and Unisonic. He also performs lead vocals for the AOR studio project Khymera.

Biography
Starting play in 1985, in 2015 left the Unisonic and 2017, he joined a new band called Panorama. The same year he also joined Firewind and former Ozzy Osbourne guitarist Gus G to produce his solo album Fearless and be part of his supporting band as the bass player and vocalist.

In June 2019, Ward was announced as the new bassist of heavy metal British band Magnum.

Discography

with Pink Cream 69 
 1989: Pink Cream 69
 1991: One Size Fits All
 1993: Games People Play
 1995: Change
 1997: Food for Thought
 1998: Electrified
 2000: Sonic Dynamite
 2000: Mixery (EP)
 2001: Endangered
 2003: Live
 2004: Thunderdome
 2007: In10sity
 2009: Live in Karlsruhe
 2013: Ceremonial
 2017: Headstrong

with D.C. Cooper 
 1999: D. C. Cooper

with Missa Mercuria 
2002: Missa Mercuria

with Place Vendome 
 2005: Place Vendome
 2009: Streets of Fire
 2013: Thunder in the Distance
 2017: Close to the Sun

with Magnum 
 2019: The Serpent Rings
 2022: The Monster Roars

with Khymera 
2005: A New Promise
2008: The Greatest Wonder
2015: The Grand Design
2020: Master of 1llusions
2023: Hold Your Ground

with Sunstorm 
2006: Sunstorm
2009: House of Dreams
2012: Emotional Fire

with Bob Catley 
2008: Immortal

with Unisonic 
2012: Ignition (EP)
2012: Unisonic
2014: For the Kingdom (EP)
2014: Light of Dawn
2017: Live in Wacken

with Panorama 
2018: Around the World

with Gus G 
2018: Fearless

As a guest

with Tribuzy 
 2005: Execution

with Bassinvaders 
2008: Hellbassbeaters

with Beverly Killz 
 2012: Gasoline & Broken Hearts

with Alekseevskaya Ploshchad 
 2016: Words

with Kiko Loureiro 
2020: Open Souce

with Edu Falaschi 
 2021: Vera Cruz

References

External links 
 

Living people
1967 births
20th-century American bass guitarists
Unisonic (band) members
Pink Cream 69 members
Magnum (band) members